FK Horgoš is a defunct football club based in Horgoš, Serbia. They achieved their best results under the sponsorship name Zlatibor Voda, before merging with Spartak Subotica in 2008.

History
After finishing sixth in the 2004–05 Vojvodina League North, the club won first place in the 2005–06 season and took promotion to the Serbian League Vojvodina. They placed fifth in their debut appearance in the third tier, before winning first place in the following 2007–08 season and earning promotion to the second tier of Serbian football. In July 2008, the club merged with Spartak Subotica to compete under the name Spartak Zlatibor Voda in the 2008–09 Serbian First League.

Honours
Serbian League Vojvodina (Tier 3)
 2007–08
Vojvodina League North (Tier 4)
 2005–06

Managerial history

References

External links
 Club page at Srbijasport

2008 disestablishments in Serbia
Association football clubs disestablished in 2008
Defunct football clubs in Serbia
Football clubs in Vojvodina